Cherkassy is a rural locality (a village) in Krasnoyarsky Selsoviet, Sterlitamaksky District, Bashkortostan, Russia. The population was 160 as of 2010. There are 4 streets.

Geography 
Cherkassy is located 20 km north of Sterlitamak (the district's administrative centre) by road. Mikhaylovka is the nearest rural locality.

References 

Rural localities in Sterlitamaksky District